Ann Hyland is a writer and historian who specialises in equestrianism and the development of horses. She is also a consultant for the Oxford English Dictionary.

Ann Hyland trains horses as well as being a freelance lecturer on equestrian topics.

Select bibliography
 Beginner's Guide to Western Riding (1971)
 Foal to Five Years (1980)
 The Endurance Horse (1988)
 Riding Long Distance (1988)
 Equus: The Horse in the Roman World (1990)
 The Appaloosa (1990)
 Training the Roman Cavalry (1993)
 The Medieval Warhorse: From Byzantium to the Crusades (1994)
 The Warhorse: 1250–1600 (1998)
 The Horse in the Middle Ages (1999)
 The Quarter Horse (1999)
 The Horse in the Ancient World (2003)
 The Warhorse in the Modern Era: Breeder to Battlefield 1600 to 1865 (2009)
 The Warhorse in the Modern Era: The Boer War to the Beginning of the Second Millennium (2010)

Notes

References

 
 
 

Year of birth missing (living people)
Living people
British historians
British horse trainers
British military historians
Place of birth missing (living people)
British women historians